Wangaratta and Ovens was an electoral district of the Legislative Assembly in the Australian state of Victoria from 1927 to 1945. It was located around the town of Wangaratta. It was created after the Electoral district of Ovens and Electoral district of Wangaratta were abolished in 1927. John Bowser was the last member for Wangaratta and the first for Wangaratta and Ovens.

Members for Wangaratta and Ovens

References

Former electoral districts of Victoria (Australia)
1927 establishments in Australia
1945 disestablishments in Australia